Mark McJennett (born 1 September 1954), also known by the nickname of "Macker", is a Welsh former rugby union, and professional rugby league footballer who played in the 1970s and 1980s.

Background
Mark McJennett was born in Cardiff, Wales.

Playing career

International honours
Mark McJennett won 3 caps for Wales (RL) while at Barrow 1980–1984 2-caps plus 1 as substitute.

County Cup Final appearances
Mark McJennett played right-, i.e. number 10, in Barrow's 12-8 victory over Widnes in the 1983 Lancashire County Cup Final during the 1983–84 season at Central Park, Wigan, on Saturday 1 October 1983, the entire Barrow team was inducted into the Barrow Hall of Fame in 2003.

Outside of rugby
Mark McJennett is a Company Director.

Genealogical Information
Mark McJennett is the son of the rugby union footballer who played in the 1940s, 1950s and 1960s for Cardiff, Newport, and Crawshays, and coached in the 1960s and 1970s for Newport, Ian McJennett.

References

External links
(archived by web.archive.org) Profile at blackandambers.co.uk
(archived by web.archive.org) Profile at cardiffrfc.com
Newport RFC : 1978/9 Season Summary

1954 births
Living people
Barrow Raiders players
Cardiff RFC players
Crawshays RFC players
Footballers who switched code
Newport RFC players
Rugby league players from Cardiff
Rugby league props
Rugby league second-rows
Rugby union flankers
Rugby union players from Cardiff
Rugby union wings
Wales national rugby league team players
Welsh rugby league players
Welsh rugby union players